Charles Foster Richards (July 9, 1866 – November 29, 1944), of New York City, was a lifelong stamp collector and a charter member of the American Philatelic Association (now called the American Philatelic Society).

Collecting interests
Richards specialized in the collection and study of postage stamps of Hawaii, including postal history, revenue stamps, and postal stationery. As an early expert on stamps of Hawaii, he published, in 1916, A Check List of the Stamps of Hawaii - and More, and, in 1938, he added more material to it. He also wrote a paper entitled Hawaiian Stamped Envelopes which was included, in 1916, in Mekeel's Handbook No. 10, Postage Stamps and Stationery of the Hawaiian Islands.

Philatelic activity
Charles Foster Richards remained active in philatelic organizations and spent much of his time studying counterfeit stamps and recommending that the backs of such stamps be marked by experts to show their lack of authenticity.

Honors and awards
Richards was named to the American Philatelic Society Hall of Fame in 1945.

See also
 Philately
 Philatelic literature

References
 Charles Foster Richards

1866 births
1944 deaths
Philatelic literature
American philatelists
People from New York City
American Philatelic Society